Clive Saney (born 2 July 1948) is a former Trinidad cyclist. He competed in three events at the 1972 Summer Olympics.

References

1948 births
Living people
Trinidad and Tobago male cyclists
Olympic cyclists of Trinidad and Tobago
Cyclists at the 1972 Summer Olympics
Place of birth missing (living people)
20th-century Trinidad and Tobago people